Eugenie Briollet (7 November 1900 – 1 May 1985) was a French diver. She competed in the women's 3 metre springboard event at the 1924 Summer Olympics.

References

External links
 

1900 births
1985 deaths
French female divers
Olympic divers of France
Divers at the 1924 Summer Olympics
Sportspeople from Strasbourg
20th-century French women